Raipur Rangers is a tennis team representing the Indian city of Raipur in Champions Tennis League. The players representing this team are  Thomas Muster, Roberto Bautista Agut, Alizé Cornet, Ramkumar Ramanathan.

Players

References

Tennis teams in India
Sports teams in Chhattisgarh
Sport in Raipur, Chhattisgarh
Raipur, Chhattisgarh
2015 establishments in Chhattisgarh
Sports clubs established in 2015